The 2009 PartyPoker.net European Championship was the second edition of the PDC tournament, the European Championship, which allows the top European players to compete against the highest ranked players from the PDC Order of Merit. The tournament took place from 29 October–1 November 2009 at the Claus Event Center in Hoofddorp, Netherlands. It featured a field of 32 players and £200,000 in prize money, with £50,000 going to the winner.

World number one and defending champion Phil Taylor successfully defended his title, defeating Steve Beaton 11–3 in the final with a record tournament average of 111.54.

Prize money

Qualification
The top 16 players from the PDC Order of Merit after the Players Championship double-header in Nuland automatically qualified for the event. The top 8 from these rankings were also the seeded players. The remaining 16 places went to the top 8 non-qualified players from the 2009 Players Championship Order of Merit, and then to the top 8 non-qualified players from the 2009 Continental Europe Order of Merit.

Draw and results
Draw and schedule of play as follows:

Scores after player's names are three-dart averages (total points scored divided by darts thrown and multiplied by 3)

Statistics

References

External links
European Championship page on the PDC's official website

European Championship (darts)
European Championship Darts
European Championship Darts